Scopula pseudagrata is a moth of the family Geometridae. It is found on Borneo and possibly the Philippines (Luzon). The habitat consists of lowland forests, alluvial forests and forests on limestone.

The wingspan is 14–15 mm for males and about 14 mm for females.

References

Moths described in 1997
pseudagrata
Moths of Asia